Srđan Živković (born 14 March 1986) is a Serbian former professional basketball player.

Professional career 
Until 22 February 2019, Živković was the record-holder for being the youngest player to have appeared in a EuroLeague game. Živković made his debut for Partizan in an 86–77 win over Telindus Oostende in the opening game of the 2001–02 EuroLeague season. That was his first and last EuroLeague game. Živković parted ways with Partizan in 2003 and then continued his career in various non-EuroLeague Balkan clubs, OKK Beograd, Ergonom, MZT Skopje, Napredak Kruševac, Mašinac, and Rilski Sportist. He last played for Nyon in Switzerland before his retirement in 2015.

National team career 
In July 2001, Živković was a member of the Yugoslav Cadets that won a gold medal at the European Championship for Cadets in Riga, Latvia. He played only one game, recording only one rebound in an 86–55 win over the Italy. 

In July 2004, Živković was a member of the Serbia and Montenegro under-18 team that participated at the FIBA Europe U18 Championship in Zaragoza, Spain. Over six tournament games, he averaged 5.7 points, 2.2 rebounds, and 0.8 assists per game. His team was ranked 5th at the Championship with a 5–3 record.

See also 
 List of youngest EuroLeague players

References

External links
 Eurobasket profile
 RealGM profile
 Proballers profile

1986 births
Living people
Basketball players from Belgrade
Basketball League of Serbia players
BC Rilski Sportist players
KK Ergonom players
KK Mašinac players
KK Napredak Kruševac players
KK MZT Skopje players
KK Partizan players
OKK Beograd players
Serbian expatriate basketball people in Bulgaria
Serbian expatriate basketball people in Switzerland
Serbian expatriate basketball people in North Macedonia
Serbian men's basketball players
Small forwards